Sudarat Keyuraphan is a Thai politician and former chairwoman of Pheu Thai Party's strategic committee. She held various positions in the cabinet and served multiple terms as a Member of Parliament. She was her party's prime minister candidate in the 2019 Thai general election.

Family and personal life

Sudarat was born in Bangkok to Mr. Sompon Keyurapan and Mrs. Renu Keyuraphan. Her father was the former Member of Parliament from Nakhon Ratchasima Province. Sudarat graduated high-school from St. Joseph Convent School in Bangkok. She earned her bachelor's degree from Chulalongkorn University in commerce and accountancy and a master's degree from the Sasin Graduate Institute of Business Administration. In 2018, she earned her doctoral degree in Buddhist studies from Mahachulalongkornrajavidyalaya University.

Sudarat is married to Mr. Somyos Leelapunyalert, who is a real estate entrepreneur. They have 3 children whose names are Phumphat, Peeraphat, and Yossuda.

Political work 
Sudarat began her political career as part of the Palang Dharma Party, being elected an MP for Bangkok's District 12 in the election of March 1992. She was reelected in September of the same year and was appointed deputy government spokesperson for Chuan Leekpai’s Government.

In 1994, Sudarat was appointed Secretary-General of the Palang Dharma Party and was also appointed Deputy Minister of Transport.

In the 1995 Election, Sudarat was re-elected MP and was appointed Deputy Minister of Interior in Banharn Silpa-archa’s Government.

In 1996, Sudarat was once again elected MP and was the only member to be elected from Palang Dharma.

Two years later, in 1998, Sudarat co-founded the Thai Rak Thai Party together with Thaksin Shinawatra and 21 others, including Somkid Jatusripitak, Thanong Bidaya, Purachai Piumsombun, Thammarak Isaragura na Ayuthaya, and Prommin Lertsuridej. Sudarat was appointed Deputy Leader of Thai Rak Thai

In the 2001 election, Sudarat was elected a Member of Parliament and was appointed Minister of Public Health on February 17, 2001 under the Thaksin government. She was involved in a long-running scandal over the purchase of overpriced computers for hospitals by the Ministry of Public Health.

The 2006 election saw her party win over 61% of the vote, becoming the largest party, and Sudarat was appointed Minister of Agriculture and Cooperatives. She lost her position following the September 2006 coup.

As one of 111 executive members of the TRT, she was banned from political activities for five years after the 2006 coup d'état.

Sudarat later returned to Thai politics, contesting the 2019 election as a party-list MP and prime ministerial candidate for the Pheu Thai Party. However, although the party won the most constituency seats, it did not win any party-list seats.

Notable awards and honors 
 1996 - Thailand Tatler Award “Most talked about personality of the year”
 1997 – Notable Alumni Awards from Faculty of Commerce and Accountancy from Chulalongkorn University 
 2003 – Tobacco-Free World Award from WHO
 2003 – Mental Health Princess Award in supporting Mental health from Her Royal Highness Princess Galyani Vadhana 
 2014 – World Buddhist Outstanding Leader Award from World Fellowship of Buddhists 
 2015 – Asoka Pilla Trophy Religion Leader from The Association of Distinguished Contributors to Buddhism of Thailand

Royal decorations 
 1996 Knight Grand Cordon (Special Class) of the Most Noble Order of the Crown of Thailand

 1999 Knight Grand Cordon (Special Class) of the Most Exalted Order of the White Elephant

 2005 Member of the Most Illustrious Order of Chula Chom Klao

 2005 Knight Grand Cross (First Class) of the Most Admirable Order of the Direkgunabhorn

References

External links
 Official site
 
 

1961 births
Living people
Sudarat Keyuraphan
Sudarat Keyuraphan
Sudarat Keyuraphan
Sudarat Keyuraphan
Sudarat Keyuraphan
Sudarat Keyuraphan
20th-century women politicians
Sudarat Keyuraphan
Sudarat Keyuraphan
Sudarat Keyuraphan
Sudarat Keyuraphan
Sudarat Keyuraphan